Léon Louyet (Loos-en-Gohelle, France, 7 July 1906 — Charleroi, 19 March 1973) was a Belgian professional road bicycle racer. In 1933 he won two stages in the Tour de France.

Major results

1931
 national road race championships for amateurs
Tour of Belgium for amateurs
1932
Tour of Belgium
1933
Paris - Poitiers
Paris - Vichy
Wegnez
Tour de France:
Winner stages 5 and 16

External links 

Official Tour de France results for Léon Louyet

Belgian male cyclists
1906 births
1973 deaths
Belgian Tour de France stage winners
Sportspeople from Pas-de-Calais
Cyclists from Hauts-de-France